The Midland Railway 1532 class was a class of 65 0-4-4T locomotives built by Derby Works between 1881 and 1886 to the design of Samuel W. Johnson. They were a development of the 1252 class. Originally numbered 1532–1551, 1632–1656, and 1718–1737; under the 1907 renumbering scheme they became 1266–1330, and were given the power classification 1P.

Construction history
The sixty-five engines of this class were all built by Derby Works using the type C boiler that had also been used on the previous class – the 1252 – and the class before that – the 6 class.

Service history
All were in service at the 1907 renumbering, and all bar three passed to the London, Midland and Scottish Railway at the 1923 Grouping, the exceptions were two that had been withdrawn and a third No. 1305, that had been transferred to the Somerset and Dorset Joint Railway in January 1921; it came into LMS stock when the S&DJR stock was absorbed in January 1930.

Withdrawals started in 1919, and fourteen locomotives were still in LMS stock at the end of 1947, to be inherited by British Railways.

No. 1307 was withdrawn in January 1948; in March the remaining thirteen (1272/73/75/78/90/95/98, 1303/15/22/24/30) were allocated the BR numbers 58039–58051, although five did not receive their BR numbers before their withdrawal. The last, 58051 was withdrawn in October 1956.

None were preserved.

Models
Bachmann Branchline announced on 8 January 2017 that it would be producing models of the class in Midland Railway maroon, LMS black and BR black.

References

Bibliography

1532
0-4-4T locomotives
Railway locomotives introduced in 1881
Standard gauge steam locomotives of Great Britain
Scrapped locomotives